Luch (The Ray) was a Menshevik legal daily newspaper in Russia, published in St. Petersburg from 1912 to July 1913. In all, 237 issues were published. The newspaper survived mainly on the donations from liberals. Its policy was controlled by P. B. Axelrod, F. I. Dan, L. Martov and A. S. Martynov.

References

Defunct newspapers published in Russia
Russian-language newspapers
Newspapers established in 1912
Publications disestablished in 1913
1912 establishments in the Russian Empire
1910s disestablishments in the Russian Empire
Mass media in Saint Petersburg